Oxnard is a city in Ventura County, California, United States. On California's South Coast, it is the most populous city in Ventura County and the 22nd-most-populous city in California.

It is at the western edge of the fertile Oxnard Plain, adjacent to agricultural fields with strawberries, lima beans and other vegetable crops. Oxnard is also a major transportation hub in Southern California, with Amtrak, Union Pacific, Metrolink, Greyhound, and Intercalifornias stopping there. It also has a small regional airport, Oxnard Airport (OXR). The town also has significant connections to the nearby oil fields  Oxnard Oil Field and the West Montalvo Oil Field. The high density of oil, industry and agricultural activities around the city, have led to several environmental issues.

Oxnard's population was 202,063 in 2020, and is largely Latino. It is the most populous city in the Oxnard–Thousand Oaks–Ventura, CA Metropolitan Statistical Area.

History

Before the arrival of Europeans, the area was inhabited by Chumash Native Americans.  The first European to encounter the area was explorer João Rodrigues Cabrilho, who claimed it for Spain in 1542. During the mission period, Mission San Buenaventura, established in 1782, used the area for raising cattle.

Ranching began to take hold among Californio settlers, who lost their regional influence when California became a US state in 1850.  At about the same time, the area was settled by American farmers, who cultivated barley and lima beans.

The Gottfried Maulhardt/Albert Pfeiler Farm site is now an historic farm park.

Henry T. Oxnard, founder of Moorhead, Minnesota-based American Crystal Sugar Company who operated a successful sugar beet factory with his three brothers (Benjamin, James, and Robert) in Chino, California, was enticed to build a $2 million factory on the plain inland from Port Hueneme. Shortly after the 1897 beet campaign, a new town emerged, now commemorated on the National Register of Historic Places as the Henry T. Oxnard Historic District. Oxnard intended to name the settlement after the Greek word for "sugar", zachari, but frustrated by bureaucracy, named it after himself. Given the potential growth of the town of Oxnard, in the spring of 1898, a railroad station was built to service the plant, which attracted a population of Chinese, Japanese, and Mexican laborers and enough commerce to merit the designation of a town. The Oxnard brothers, who never lived in their namesake city, sold both the Chino and the giant red-brick Oxnard factory in 1899 for nearly $4 million. The Oxnard factory with its landmark twin smokestacks operated from August 19, 1899, until October 26, 1959. Factory operations were interrupted in the Oxnard Strike of 1903.

Oxnard was incorporated as a California city on June 30, 1903, and the public library was opened in 1907. Prior to and during World War II, the naval bases of Point Mugu and Port Hueneme were established in the area to take advantage of the only major navigable port on California's coast between the Port of Los Angeles and San Francisco Bay, and the bases in turn encouraged the development of the defense-based aerospace and communications industries.

In the mid-20th century Oxnard grew and developed the areas outside the downtown with homes, industry, retail, and a new harbor named Channel Islands Harbor. Martin V. ("Bud") Smith (1916–2001) became an influential developer. Smith's first enterprise in 1941 was the Colonial House Restaurant (demolished 1988) and then the Wagon Wheel Junction in 1947, (demolished 2011). He was also involved in the development of the high-rise towers at the Topa Financial Plaza, the Channel Islands Harbor, Casa Sirena Resort, the Esplanade Shopping Mall, Fisherman's Wharf, the Carriage Square Shopping Center, the Maritime Museum, and many other hotel, restaurant and retail projects.

In June 2004, the Oxnard Police Department and the Ventura County Sheriff imposed a gang injunction over a  area of the central district of the city, in order to restrict gang activity. The injunction was upheld in the Ventura County Superior Court and made a permanent law in 2005. A similar injunction was imposed in September 2006 over a  area of the south side of the city. Prohibited activities include associating with other known gang members, witness intimidation, possessing firearms or using gang gestures. Since then, court decisions have made adding people to the civil orders more stringent, stemming from lawsuits in Los Angeles and Orange counties. Judges determined that it was unconstitutional for people to be added to a gang injunction without a due-process hearing. As a result of budget cuts due to the COVID-19 pandemic, the Oxnard police stopped maintaining and enforcing the injunction in 2020.

Geography
Oxnard is located on the Oxnard Plain, an area with fertile soil. With its beaches, dunes, wetlands, creeks and the Santa Clara River, the area contains a number of important biological communities.  Native plant communities include: coastal sage scrub, California Annual Grassland, and Coastal Dune Scrub species; however, most native plants have been eliminated from within the city limits to make way for agriculture and urban and industrial development.  Also native to the region is the endangered Ventura Marsh Milkvetch, and the last self-sustaining population is in Oxnard in the center of an approved housing development.

Rivers
The Santa Clara River separates Oxnard and Ventura.  Tributaries to this river include Sespe Creek, Piru Creek, and Castaic Creek.

Geology

Oxnard is on a tectonically active plate, since most of Coastal California is near the boundaries between the Pacific and North American Plates.  The San Andreas Fault, which demarcates this boundary, is about 40 miles away.

One active fault that transverses Oxnard is the Oak Ridge Fault, which straddles the Santa Clara River Valley westward from the Santa Susana Mountains, crosses the Oxnard Plain through Oxnard, and extends into the Santa Barbara Channel. The coastline is subject to inundation by a tsunami up to 23 feet in height.

The fault has proven to be a significant contributor to seismic activity in the Oxnard region and beyond. The 6.7  Northridge earthquake that occurred on January 17, 1994, is believed to have occurred in the Santa Clarita extension of the Oak Ridge Fault.

Climate
Oxnard is the location of the National Weather Service forecast office that serves the Los Angeles area. The city is situated in a Mediterranean (dry subtropical) climate zone, experiencing mild and relatively wet winters, and warm, dry summers, in a climate called the warm-summer Mediterranean climate. Onshore breezes keep the communities of Oxnard cooler in summer and warmer in winter than those further inland. The average mean temperature is 61 °F (16 °C). The average minimum temperature is 52 °F (11 °C) and the average maximum temperature is 69 °F (21 °C). Generally the weather is mild and dry, with around 300 days of sunshine annually.

Wildlife and ecology

The area contains a number of important biological communities.  Native plant communities include coastal sage scrub, California Annual Grassland, and Coastal Dune Scrub species; however, most native plants have been eliminated from within the city limits to make way for development.  Also native to the region is the endangered Ventura Marsh Milkvetch, with the last self-sustaining population in Oxnard being at the center of a housing development.

The balance of wildlife in Oxnard is similar to that of most places in southern California, with small mammals being common in urbanized areas, like squirrels, raccoons, and skunks. Coyotes prey on these smaller mammals. Small birds and mammals can be food for stray, feral, and pet dogs and cats.

Environmental issues
Oxnard has more coastal power plants than any other city in California, with three fossil-fuel power plants providing energy for cities in both Ventura and Santa Barbara Counties. The California Environmental Protection Agency (CalEPA) has identified Oxnard as a city excessively burdened by multiple sources of pollution. Two of the power plants use ocean water cooling. The Office of Environmental Health Hazard Assessment has categorized much of Oxnard in the top 10 percent of ZIP codes most negatively impacted by pollution in the state.
  In May 2015, the Oxnard City Council unanimously voted to extend the city moratorium on power plant construction. This moratorium extension occurred due to NRG/Southern California Edison's proposal, also referred to as the Puente Power Project, to construct a new fossil-fuel power plant. The next morning, a NRG representative stated their case to replace the old power generation plant at Mandalay beach with a new, hi-tech, much cleaner and more efficient plant.

Pesticides are used in the agricultural fields surrounding Oxnard, as the area is one of the nation's leading strawberry producers, with agriculture being one of the top contributors to Oxnard's economy.  Strawberries depend on large applications of fumigants containing pesticides. The Center for Health Journalism reported four ZIP codes with the highest pesticide use in the state clustered around Oxnard.

Rio Mesa High School, surrounded by agricultural fields of the Oxnard Plain, has been at the center of a Title VI Civil Rights Act complaint since 1999, covering three generations. Title VI prohibits recipients of federal funding from discriminating on the basis of race, color or national origin. The U.S. Environmental Protection Agency (EPA) routinely awards California pesticide regulators millions of dollars in grants. The EPA is required to ensure the recipients of its funding to be in compliance with Title VI. The plaintiffs argue that California pesticide regulators violated Title VI, by approving permits for toxins that disproportionately impacted Latino schoolchildren, who attended schools adjacent to fields with the highest methyl bromide levels in the state.

Architecture

The historical architectural styles of Oxnard ranch family homes are Victorian era, Italian style, and Carpenter Gothic. In the Henry T. Oxnard Historic District, there are five Prairie School and eight Tudor Revival homes. The district includes Mission/Spanish Revival, Bungalow/craftsman, Colonial Revival, and other architecture.

Cityscape

Oxnard is a combination of neighborhoods, and urban development focused on the downtown, coastline, and harbor areas. The city's main land uses are industrial, residential, commercial, and open space. The city is characterized by one and two-story buildings. The two tallest buildings in the county are in the northern part of the city at Topa Financial Plaza. The fourteen floor high-rise was built in 1973 and the 21 floor high-rise was built in 1986. The city is surrounded by agricultural land and the Pacific Ocean, as well as the Santa Clara River. The city's primary development lies along Highway 101 and the other main roads.

The Henry T. Oxnard Historic District is a  historic district that was listed on the National Register of Historic Places in Oxnard. Covering approximately F and G Sts., between Palm and 5th Sts., in the city, the district includes 139 contributing buildings and includes homes mostly built before 1925. It contains Craftsman and Revival architecture in abundance.

Ormond Beach is a beach along the Oxnard coast. The beach, which stretches for two miles, adjoins the Ormond Wetlands, some farmland, and power plant remains. It covers the area in between Points Hueneme and Mugu, and is a well-known birding area. The beach historically contained marshes, salt flat, sloughs, and lagoons, but surrounding agriculture and industry have drained, filled, and degraded the beach and wetlands. However, there is still a dune-transition zone-marsh system along much of the beach.

Demographics

2010
The 2010 United States Census reported that Oxnard had a population of 197,899. The racial makeup of Oxnard included 95,346 (48.2%) White, 5,771 (2.9%) African American, 2,953 (1.5%) Native American, 14,550 (7.4%) Asian, 658 (0.3%) Pacific Islander, 69,527 (35.1%) from other races, and 9,094 (4.6%) from two or more races. In addition, 145,551 people (73.5%) were Hispanic or Latino, of any race. Non-Hispanic Whites were 14.9% of the population in 2010, compared to 42.6% in 1980.

The Census reported that 196,465 people (99.3% of the population) lived in households, 932 (0.5%) lived in non-institutionalized group quarters, and 502 (0.3%) were institutionalized.

There were 49,797 households, out of which 25,794 (51.8%) had children under the age of 18 living in them, 28,319 (56.9%) were opposite-sex married couples living together, 7,634 (15.3%) had a female householder with no husband present, 4,043 (8.1%) had a male householder with no wife present.  There were 3,316 (6.7%) unmarried opposite-sex partnerships, and 395 (0.8%) same-sex married couples or partnerships. 7,090 households (14.2%) were made up of individuals, and 2,665 (5.4%) had someone living alone who was 65 years of age or older. The average household size was 3.95.  There were 39,996 families (80.3% of all households); the average family size was 4.20.

The population was spread out, with 59,018 people (29.8%) under the age of 18, 23,913 people (12.1%) aged 18 to 24, 57,966 people (29.3%) aged 25 to 44, 40,584 people (20.5%) aged 45 to 64, and 16,418 people (8.3%) who were 65 years of age or older.  The median age was 29.9 years. For every 100 females, there were 103.0 males.  For every 100 females age 18 and over, there were 102.4 males.

The homeowner vacancy rate was 1.8%; the rental vacancy rate was 3.7%.  107,482 people (54.3% of the population) lived in owner-occupied housing units and 88,983 people (45.0%) lived in rental housing units.

2000 census
As of the census of 2000, there were 170,358 people, 43,576 households, and 34,947 families residing in the city. The population density was 6,729.7 inhabitants per square mile (2,598.8/km2). The racial makeup of the city was 42.1% White, 3.8% African American, 1.3% Native American, 7.4% Asian, 0.4% Pacific Islander, 40.4% from other races, and 4.7% from two or more races. Two-thirds of the population (66.2%) was Hispanic or Latino of any race.

There were 43,576 households, out of which 46.1% had children under the age of 18 living with them, 59.4% were married couples living together, 14.1% had a female householder with no husband present, and 19.8% were non-families. 14.6% of all households were made up of individuals, and 5.6% had someone living alone who was 65 years of age or older.  The average household size was 3.85 and the average family size was 4.16

In the city, the population was spread out, with 31.8% under the age of 18, 11.8% from 18 to 24, 31.0% from 25 to 44, 17.3% from 45 to 64, and 8.1% who were 65 years of age or older.  The median age was 29 years. For every 100 females, there were 104.6 males.  For every 100 females age 18 and over, there were 104.0 males.

The median income for a household in the city was $48,603, and the median income for a family was $49,150. Males had a median income of $30,643 versus $25,381 for females. The per capita income for the city was $15,288.  About 11.4% of families and 15.1% of the population were below the poverty line, including 18.4% of those under age 18 and 8.8% of those age 65 or over.

Economy
The economy of Oxnard includes defense, international trade, agriculture, manufacturing, and tourism. Oxnard is a manufacturing center in the Greater Los Angeles Area. The Port of Hueneme is the only deep-harbor commercial port between Los Angeles and San Francisco and moves trade within the Pacific Rim economies. Companies utilizing the Port include Del Monte Foods, Chiquita, BMW, Land Rover, and Jaguar. Other industries include finance, transportation, the high tech industry, and energy, particularly petroleum.  Two large active oil fields underlie the city and adjacent areas:  the Oxnard Oil Field, east of the city along 5th Street, and the West Montalvo Oil Field along the coast to the west of town.  Tenby Inc.'s Oxnard Refinery, on 5th Street east of Del Norte Avenue, processes oil from both fields.

According to the city's 2021 Annual Comprehensive Financial Report, the top employers in the city are:

Other major employers include Naval Base Ventura County, Boskovich Farms, PTI Technologies, Seminis and Gills Onions.

Some of the major companies headquartered in Oxnard are Haas Automation, Seminis, Raypak, Drum Workshop, Borla Performance, Boss Audio, Seed Beauty, and Robbins Auto Tops Procter & Gamble and Sysco maintain their West Coast operations in Oxnard.

In October 2020, city officials announced that once a large swath of agricultural land is fully developed into a business park by late 2021, it estimates that up to 8,700 jobs will be created in the area. An Amazon fulfillment center opened in 2022 that serves Ventura, Santa Barbara, San Luis Obispo counties.

Agriculture
According to the Camarillo General Plan: "The areas studied showed a high percentage of Group I soils, primarily located on the relatively flat Oxnard Plain. The Oxnard Plain, because of these high-quality agricultural soils, coupled with a favorable climate, is considered one of the most fertile areas in the world."

In 1995, SOAR (Save Open Space and Agricultural Resources) was initiated by farmers, ranchers and citizens of Ventura County to keep land in the Oxnard Plain from development.

Strawberries

The Oxnard Plain is well known for its strawberries. According to the USDA, Oxnard is California's largest strawberry producer, supplying about one-third of the State's annual strawberry volume. From the end of September through the end of October, strawberries are planted and harvesting occurs from mid-December through mid-July in Oxnard.  The peak harvesting season in California runs from April through June, when up to 10 million pint baskets of strawberries are shipped daily. The state of California supplies over 85 percent of U.S. strawberries, with the U.S. supplying a quarter of total world production of strawberries.

The annual California Strawberry Festival features vendors as well as food items based on the fruit such as strawberry nachos, strawberry pizza, strawberry funnel cake, strawberry sundaes, and strawberry champagne.

Pests that attack this crop are very economically impactful in this town. Much of the research and effort is expended here and in Watsonville and Salinas. Economically significant insects include the Greenhouse Whitefly (Trialeurodes vaporariorum).

Cannabis

In 2018, 80% of the voters approved a cannabis tax. The city council adopted a "go slow" approach upon the legalization of recreational cannabis in California. Companies must be licensed by the local agency and the state to grow, test, or sell cannabis and the city may authorize none or only some of these activities. Local governments may not prohibit adults, who are in compliance with state laws, from growing, using, or transporting marijuana for personal use. After an initial ban, businesses that focus on manufacturing, testing and distributing cannabis were allowed to apply for a permit to operate in July 2019. An initial process in May 2020 to select retail proposals was challenged by unsuccessful applicants. After revising the city ordinance, the council decided in September 2020 to allow 10 retail licences to be issued. A social equity component to maximize the ability for communities of color to benefit from the new industry as owners and investors and managers and employees as allowed by state law was not included. A special-use permit was approved for a retail store in an Oxnard Shores neighborhood shopping center in February 2022 amidst organized opposition from the neighborhood. The first dispensary in the city opened in the downtown area in December 2022.

Oil fields

Oxnard

West Montalvo

Arts and culture

Oxnard cultural institutions include the Carnegie Art Museum, founded in 1907 as the Oxnard Public Library by philanthropist Andrew Carnegie; the Chandler Vintage Museum of Transportation and Wildlife, founded by the late Los Angeles Times publisher Otis Chandler, the Murphy Auto Museum, and the Channel Islands Maritime Museum.  The Henry T. Oxnard Historic District is adjacent to the commercial downtown area and dates back to the founding of the city.

Heritage Square in downtown is a collection of restored Victorian and Craftsman houses that were once owned by Oxnard's pioneer ranching families. Heritage Square is home to the Petit Playhouse and the Elite Theatre Company. The Oxnard Performing Arts and Convention Center is home to the New West Symphony.

Oxnard also has the Oxnard Independent Film Festival and the annual Channel Islands Tall Ships Festival.  The Herzog Winery is based in Oxnard along with other wine tasting rooms. During late July, the annual Salsa Festival is held in downtown Oxnard, featuring a salsa tasting tent, local bands, a large dance floor, local vendors, as well as many salsa based food vendors.

Sports

The Dallas Cowboys held their pre-season training camp at River Ridge Field in Oxnard in 2001, 2004–06, 2008–10 and 2012–16 (the Cowboys trained at California Lutheran University in nearby Thousand Oaks in 1963–89).  The New Orleans Saints trained in Oxnard in 2011. The Los Angeles Raiders trained at River Ridge in the 1980s and 90s.

On February 4, 2016, the Los Angeles Rams (an NFL team) selected Oxnard to be the site of their Official Team Activities and mini camp. On February 19, 2016, the city of Oxnard and the Rams reached a tentative agreement to host official team activities or OTAs and minicamp at River Ridge Playing Fields and on February 23, 2016, the Oxnard City Council voted unanimously 5–0 to allow the Los Angeles Rams to use the River Ridge Playing Fields facility from April 18 to June 17 and the locker room space from March 28 until June 24.

River Ridge Golf Course has two 18-hole courses flanked by housing developments.

Government

Education
The city of Oxnard is served by 54 public school campuses which provide education to more than 53,000 students in grades K–12.

Public Elementary and junior high schools
The city of Oxnard and surrounding communities are served by four different school districts which oversee education for students grades K–8. They are:
 Hueneme School District: Serves 7,600 students at 11 campuses in South Oxnard, Port Hueneme and Oxnard beach neighborhoods.
 Oxnard School District: Serves 18,000 students at 21 campuses throughout Oxnard.
 Ocean View Elementary School District: Serves 3,000 students at 6 campuses in South Oxnard.
 Rio School District: Serves 5,000 students at 8 campuses in North Oxnard and El Rio.

On February 12, 2008, a shooting involving students occurred at E.O. Green Junior High School in Oxnard. Larry King was shot in one of the classrooms where he was later taken to St. John's Hospital and died.

There are three private K–8 schools in Oxnard and one Roman Catholic High School administered by the Roman Catholic Archdiocese of Los Angeles.

Roman Catholic Grade Schools
 Our Lady of Guadalupe Elementary School, Oxnard (La Colonia) K-8
 Santa Clara Elementary School, Oxnard, TK-8
 Saint Anthony Elementary School, South Oxnard, K-8

High schools

All public high schools in Oxnard are operated by the Oxnard Union High School District (OUHSD), which provides high school education to 20,000 students at 10 campuses in three cities (Oxnard, Camarillo and Port Hueneme) as well as the unincorporated areas of El Rio, Somis, Silver Strand, and Hollywood Beach. OUHSD campuses in and around Oxnard include Channel Islands High School, Hueneme High School, Oxnard High School, Pacifica High School, Oxnard Middle College High School, and Rio Mesa High School, as well as Oxnard Adult School.  Additionally, construction of a new high school has been begun, Del Sol High School.

Santa Clara High School is a private Roman Catholic high school administered by the Archdiocese of Los Angeles.

Colleges and universities

Oxnard is served on the collegiate level by Oxnard College and nearby California State University Channel Islands. Additionally, California Lutheran University, California State University, Northridge, University of Phoenix, University of California, Santa Barbara, National University, and Azusa Pacific University have satellite campuses in Oxnard.

Library

A free public library system is operated by the city with three locations: the Downtown Main Library, the Colonia Branch Library, and the South Oxnard Branch Library. Some library sites include a Homework Center and an adjacent daycare center.

Infrastructure

Sanitation
Oxnard collects and processes trash, recyclables, and green waste for its citizens and businesses. The city also has a large treatment plant for the collection of wastewater through the sanitary sewer.

Transportation

Road
The Ventura Freeway (US 101) is the major highway running through Oxnard, connecting Ventura and Santa Barbara to the northwest, and Los Angeles to the southeast. The Pacific Coast Highway (State Route 1) heads down the coast south to Malibu. Highway 34 (Fifth Street) connects downtown Oxnard with Camarillo by running east parallel with the Southern Pacific Coast Line, which carries Coast Starlight, Pacific Surfliner and Metrolink Ventura County Line passenger trains. Highway 232 (Vineyard Avenue), heads northeast, providing connections to California State Route 118 to Saticoy and the junction with California State Route 126 which goes to Santa Paula, Fillmore and Santa Clarita.

Port

The Port of Hueneme is located south of Oxnard in the city of Port Hueneme and is jointly operated by the United States Navy and the Oxnard Harbor District. The port is the only deep water port between the Port of Long Beach and the Port of San Francisco as well as the only military deep water port between San Diego Bay and Puget Sound.

The Port of Hueneme is a shipping and receiving point for a wide variety of resources with destinations in the larger population centers of the Los Angeles Basin. Resources include automobiles, pineapples, and bananas. Agricultural products such as onions, strawberries, and flowers are shipped.

The United States Navy maintains a facility at Port Hueneme, in support of the naval air station at Point Mugu to the south, with which it comprises Naval Base Ventura County. Port Hueneme is the West Coast home of the Naval Construction Force, the "Seabees", as well as a link in the coastal radar system.

Harbor
Channel Islands Harbor provides moorings for both recreational boating and commercial fishing. It shares the nickname "Gateway to the Channel Islands" with Ventura Harbor seven miles (11 km) to the north because operations that sail to the islands out of the harbors. Both harbors are vital fishing industry harbors.

Airport
Oxnard Airport is a general aviation airport within the city that is owned and operated by the County of Ventura. While commercial service was offered in the past, no airlines currently provide service.

Public transit

The Oxnard Transit Center serves as a major transit hub for the city, as well as the west county.

Rail
Metrolink Six round-trip trains from Ventura County Line provide commuter service to Los Angeles on weekdays during peak hours.

Amtrak Ten round-trip Pacific Surfliners daily through Los Angeles to San Diego. Some northbound trains to Santa Barbara continue on to San Luis Obispo. The Coast Starlight, that travels from Los Angeles to Seattle stops twice a day (once going north, once going south), make the west Ventura County stop here (east county stop is Simi Valley).

Bus
Gold Coast Transit District Operates local bus service in the city of Oxnard, Port Hueneme, Ventura, and Ojai.  Its hub is the Oxnard Transit Center.

VCTC Intercity Operates three Conejo Connection buses during peak hours, towards the Warner Center Transit Hub in the San Fernando Valley, connecting with the Metro G Line.  The Conejo Connection does not go to the Oxnard Transit Center, but instead stops at the Esplanade Shopping Center near Highway 101.  VCTC also operates the Coastal Connection through Ventura towards Santa Barbara and Goleta from the Esplanade.

A smaller transfer center at the Centerpoint Mall on C Street for Gold Coast Transit serves South Oxnard and Port Hueneme routes. VCTC also operates the Oxnard-CSUCI route to California State University, Channel Islands and Oxnard College from this transfer center.

In popular culture

Oxnard is mentioned in the season 3 episode of The Big Bang Theory entitled The Jiminy Conjecture. Sheldon and Howard bet on what kind of cricket they hear in the hallway from Sheldon's apartment. They find the cricket and argue over a name, with Raj and Howard calling it "Toby" and Sheldon wanting to call it "Jiminy". They fail to identify the species, even with an insect guide. They settle the bet by taking the cricket to Professor Crawley (Lewis Black), Caltech's depressed entomologist, who has just lost funding for his lab. Howard is proven correct since it is a common field cricket, much to Sheldon's disappointment. While consulting Professor Crawley, he informs Howard, Sheldon, and Raj that since he lost his funding, he has to move in with his daughter in Oxnard.

Notable people

Political and cultural

 Lucy Hicks Anderson: trans-woman, socialite, and chef, most notable for being tried in the Ventura County court for perjury for marrying a man while "masquerading" as a woman in 1945.
 Lupe Anguiano: former nun and civil rights activist known for her work on women's rights, the rights of the poor, and the protection of the environment.
 John L. Canley: retired United States Marine and recipient of the U.S. military's highest decoration, the Medal of Honor.
 César Chávez: farm worker, political activist and union leader, lived in the Colonia area of Oxnard during his childhood.  Several streets and schools in the Oxnard area and surrounding areas bear his name. A home he lived in is on Wright Road in the El Rio neighborhood, northwest of Highway 101 and Rose Avenue, where Chavez lived with his family in the late 1950s while working as an advocate for local farmworkers. Also the office of the National Farm Workers Association – which later became United Farm Workers — on Cooper Road, east of Garfield Avenue in the Colonia neighborhood. The Oxnard office opened in 1966, the year of a historic march from Delano to Sacramento.
 William P. Clark: politician, served under President Ronald Reagan as the Deputy Secretary of State from 1981 to 1982, United States National Security Advisor from 1982 to 1983, and the Secretary of the Interior from 1983 until 1985.
 Alicia Cuarón: Mexican-American educator, human rights activist, and Franciscan nun
 Jean Harris: credited with protecting Ormond Beach Wetlands and Oxnard State Beach
 Meagan Hockaday: killed by police
Maria Gulovich Liu: Ventura County real estate agent, OSS agent in WWII
 Armando Xavier Ochoa: was the Bishop of Fresno and was formerly the Bishop of El Paso.
Carmen Perez is an activist on issues of civil rights, including mass incarceration, women's rights and gender equity, violence prevention, racial healing and community policing.
 Alfred V. Rascon: awarded the Medal of Honor—the United States' highest military decoration.
 James Sumner: awarded the Medal of Honor—the United States' highest military decoration, after military service, he resided in Oxnard.
 Nao Takasugi: California State Assembly and mayor of Oxnard.

Authors
Gilbert, Jaime, and Mario Hernandez: creators of the black-and-white independent comic Love and Rockets.
Joyce La Mers, author of light poetry.
Michele Serros, American author, poet, comedic social commentator and writer for the George Lopez TV series.

Musicians and entertainers
 DJ Babu: Filipino American disc jockey for the Beat Junkies and Dilated Peoples
 Ritchie Blackmore: guitarist with Deep Purple and founder of Ritchie Blackmore's Rainbow.
 Sonny Bono & Cher: Record producers, singers, actors; famous for Sonny & Cher pop duo and TV series, had a beach home in Oxnard Shores, Oxnard
 Cola Boyy: (Matthew Urango) musician and activist
 Brooke Candy: rapper
 Dave Carter: American folk singer-songwriter
 Down AKA Kilo: rapper
 Dave Grohl: musician
 Ill Repute: hardcore punk band and leaders of the Nardcore movement
 Kankick: American hip-hop producer
 Homer Keller: composer (1915–1996)
 Madlib: Oxnard-based record producer, musician, rapper, and DJ noted for his work and collaborations in the jazz and hip-hop scenes
 Rich Moore: Academy Award-winning animation director (The Simpsons), and co-owner of Rough Draft Studios, Inc.
 Nails: powerviolence band
 Oh No: hip-hop rapper, producer and brother of Madlib who is signed to Stones Throw Records
 Anderson .Paak: rapper, singer, songwriter, and drummer famous for reviving west coast soul and R&B
 Dudley Perkins: rapper, singer, songwriter, producer
 Ryan Seaman: drummer
 Shirley Verrett: operatic mezzo-soprano, 1931–2010
 The Warriors: hardcore band
 Steve Zaragoza: internet personality, comedian, and host on SourceFed.

Scholars and scientists
 William Bright: Linguist, who specialized in Native American and South Asian languages
 J. Richard Chase: President of Biola University and Wheaton College
 Robert P. Sharp: An American geomorphologist and expert on the geological surfaces of the Earth and the planet Mars, born and raised in Oxnard.

Business people
 Martin V. ("Bud") Smith: developer and philanthropist.  The most significant developer in the Oxnard area. Built the Financial Plaza Towers and financed construction of CSUCI's school of business and economics. His first real estate project was the Wagon Wheel Motel & Restaurant and Wagon Wheel Junction.
 Charles C. Lynch: is the former owner of a city-sanctioned, awarded in 2006, medical marijuana dispensary in Morro Bay, California. Lynch obtained a Medical marijuana dispensary Business License, a Medical Marijuana Nursery Permit and was a member of the local Chamber of Commerce, he was born in Oxnard.
 Stanley Clark Meston: was an American architect, most famous for designing the original golden arches of McDonald's restaurants, he was born in Oxnard.
 Ben Rich: was Director of Lockheed Skunk Works from 1975 to 1991 and retired to Oxnard.

Actors and TV personalities
Walter Brennan, actor, three-time winner of Academy Award, star of TV series The Real McCoys and The Guns of Will Sonnett, died in Oxnard.
Miles Brown, actor who is best known for his role as Jack Johnson on the sitcom Black-ish.
John Carradine, actor, lived in Oxnard for many years.
Lee Van Cleef, actor, died in Oxnard.
Jeffrey Combs, actor, born in Oxnard.
Brandon Cruz, child actor and lead singer of the punk band Dr. Know, has family and a beach home in Oxnard.
Brad Garrett, actor, born in Oxnard.
John Curtis Holmes, pornographic film star of the 1970s, had ashes scattered at sea off the coast of Oxnard in 1988.
Isiah Mustafa, the "Old Spice Guy," former NFL player.
Jamal Mixon, actor.
Bob Stephenson, actor, film producer and screenwriter.
Tricia Takasugi, reporter for KTTV Fox 11 News in Los Angeles.
Dan Tullis Jr., an actor most notable for his role on the sitcom Married... with Children.

Athletes and sportspeople
Bobby Ayala: former Major League Baseball pitcher for the Cincinnati Reds, Seattle Mariners, Chicago Cubs and Montreal Expos; graduated from Rio Mesa High School.
Mark Berry:  coach for the Cincinnati Reds; graduated from Hueneme High School.
The Bryan brothers: professional ATP tennis doubles players who have graduated from Rio Mesa High School.
Lorenzo Booker: NFL running back.
Graciela Casillas: boxer and kickboxer.
Hugo Centeno Jr.: boxer in the Middleweight division.
Keary Colbert: wide receiver for the Seattle Seahawks; all-time reception leader for USC Trojans; graduated from Hueneme High School.
Jacob Cruz: outfielder for the Cincinnati Reds; graduated from Channel Islands High School.
Tim Curran: professional surfer; graduated from Oxnard High School.
Lou Cvijanovich: winningest coach in California high school history; coached Santa Clara High School to 829 wins 1958–1999.
Maxim Dadashev trained in Oxnard with former world champion Buddy McGirt
Justin De Fratus: relief pitcher for the Philadelphia Phillies, grew up in Oxnard, attended Rio Mesa High and Ventura Junior College.
Charles Dillon: wide receiver for Green Bay Packers; played for Ventura College and Washington State; graduated from Hueneme High School in '04
Terrance Dotsy: football player.
Justin Dumais: diver of 2004 Summer Olympics.
Beverly Dustrude: was a second base-woman who played in the All-American Girls Professional Baseball League.
Tony Ferguson: a professional mixed martial artist in the lightweight division of the Ultimate Fighting Championship (UFC); born in Oxnard.
Scott Fujita: NFL linebacker for the Cleveland Browns; graduated from Rio Mesa High School and University of California, Berkeley.
Mikey Garcia: boxer
Robert Garcia: retired professional boxer; former IBF Super Featherweight Champion.
Phil Giebler: race car driver, won Indianapolis 500 Rookie of the Year award for 2007.
Herculez Gomez: soccer player
Jim Hall: race car driver; two-time winning car owner of the Indianapolis 500.
Lemuel Clarence "Bud" Houser: was a track athlete and won multiple Olympic gold medals; track athlete at Oxnard High School.
Jeremy Jackson: pro UFC fighter, winner of King of the Mountain 2004, contestant in Ultimate Fighter 4 : The Comeback.
Ronney Jenkins: 2001 NFL Pro Bowl kick returner for the San Diego Chargers; graduated from Hueneme High School.
Nicole Johnson: Monster Jam monster truck driver; graduated from Rio Mesa High School
Marion Jones: athlete, disqualified multiple Olympic gold medalist, attended and ran for Rio Mesa High School
Eric King: former Major League Baseball pitcher; born in Oxnard.
Tim Laker: former Major League Baseball catcher; played college baseball at Oxnard Community College.
Dave Laut: UCLA graduate won Olympic Bronze at the 1984 Summer Olympics for shot put.
Whitney Lewis: former USC Trojans and University of Northern Iowa wide receiver; won 2003 Glenn Davis Award for top player in Southern California
Tony Malinosky: former Major League Baseball shortstop for the Brooklyn Dodgers; longtime resident of Oxnard.
Kristal Marshall: professional wrestler formerly with the World Wrestling Entertainment.
Sergio Martínez: boxer, based in Oxnard.
Paul McAnulty: Major League Baseball outfielder with the San Diego Padres.
Ken McMullen: former Major League Baseball third baseman with the Los Angeles Dodgers; was born in Oxnard.
Victor Ortíz: professional boxer.
Mike Parrott: professional baseball player and coach; born in Oxnard.
Corey Pavin: professional golfer; winner of many tournaments including 1995 U.S. Open; graduated from Oxnard High School.
Terry Pendleton: retired baseball player, 1991 National League MVP; graduated from Channel Islands High School.
Josh Pinkard: free safety for two-time national champion University of Southern California football team; graduated from Hueneme High School.
Brandon Rios: professional boxer, the current WBA World lightweight champion.
Jacob Rogers: offensive tackle for the Denver Broncos, three-year starter and All-American at USC; graduated from Oxnard High School.
Blaine Saipaia: football player for the St. Louis Rams; graduated from Channel Islands High School.
Aaron Small: former Major League Baseball pitcher
Paul Stankowski: professional golfer; graduated from Hueneme High School.
Kevin Thomas: former National Football League cornerback for the Buffalo Bills, graduated from Rio Mesa High School.
Josh Towers: pitcher for the Toronto Blue Jays; graduated from Hueneme High School and Oxnard College.
Steve Trachsel: pitcher for the Baltimore Orioles and New York Mets was born in Oxnard and attended Hathaway Elementary.
Fernando Vargas: retired boxer, two-time light-middleweight boxing champion; graduated from Channel Islands High School.
Dmitri Young: baseball player for the Washington Nationals; graduated from Rio Mesa High School.
Blake Wingle:  offensive guard for the Pittsburgh Steelers, Green Bay Packers and the Cleveland Browns; graduated from Rio Mesa High School.
Cierre Wood: a running back of the Canadian Football League (CFL); former member of the Houston Texans, the New England Patriots, and the Buffalo Bills. Graduated from Santa Clara High School.
David Ochoa: Soccer player in the MLS for Real Salt Lake and the Mexico Men's National Team. Born in Oxnard.
 Jeremiah Valoaga: NFL defensive end; graduated from Channel Islands High School.

Sister cities
  Ocotlán, Jalisco (Mexico)

See also
 Largest cities in Southern California
 Oxnard Air Force Base

References

Further reading
 Barajas, Frank P. Curious Unions: Mexican American Workers and Resistance in Oxnard, California, 1898–1961. Lincoln, NE: University of Nebraska Press, 2012.
 
 
 Gutleben, Dan, The Oxnard Beet Sugar Factory, Oxnard, California, 1959 – Revised 1960, page 1, Book available at the Oxnard Public Library

External links

Oxnard Convention and Visitors Bureau

 
1903 establishments in California
Cities in Ventura County, California
Incorporated cities and towns in California
Populated coastal places in California
Populated places established in 1903
Port cities in California
Seaside resorts in California
Santa Clara River (California)